The Toll is a 2020 Canadian thriller film written and directed by Michael Nader. The film stars Jordan Hayes and Max Topplin. The film premiered at the 2020 Bucheon International Fantastic Film Festival.

Plot
A socially awkward driver and a weary passenger try to make it to their destination while being haunted by a supernatural threat.They wander around in the woods while a supernatural being, the toll man messes with their minds. While they're outside the car, an old woman in a tractor comes by and tells them all about the toll man who senses death and brings it to his street. Cami begs her to call the police and her father but she says it won't be of any help.

They decide to go to a detour that was a few minutes back. Cami, who is absolutely creeped out, finds an old house which they both recognise. They go in and find some screens and a camera. Cami sits in front of a camera. A video appears on the screen of a man and a woman and the woman shows them that Spencer will murder Cami. The camera feed appears on the screen and he picks up a knife but Cami grabs a gun on the table. They recall the old woman telling them that if he can't see them (the toll man) he cant get into their minds so they go back to the car and cover it with dark bags. They realise that only one of them has to die.

Spencer purposely attacks Cami and starts to grab her clothes, her body, and he might rape her. Cami stops him as she murders him and the father shows soon as the credits starts.

Cast
 Jordan Hayes as Cami
 Max Topplin as Spencer
 James McGowan as Neil
 Rosemary Dunsmore as Lorraine
Sarah Camacho as Girl

Release
On February 9, 2021, Lionsgate announced that The Toll would be released on Blu-ray and DVD on March 30, 2021.

References

External links
 
 

2020 films
Canadian thriller films
English-language Canadian films
2020s English-language films
2020s Canadian films